Maksym Ivko (born 6 January 1995) is a Ukrainian biathlete. He competed in the Biathlon Junior World Championships in 2012 and 2013.

Performances

References

External links
 Biathlon.com.ua
 IBU Datacenter

1995 births
Living people
Ukrainian male biathletes
Sportspeople from Chernihiv
Biathletes at the 2012 Winter Youth Olympics
Universiade bronze medalists for Ukraine
Universiade medalists in biathlon
Competitors at the 2017 Winter Universiade